Impericon.com is a German website that sells metalcore-scene-based clothing, concert tickets, and other media and accessories.

History
At first, Impericon was named Imperial Clothing, but because of a clash with a brand company in Italy, they were forced to change their name. They ran a poll to decide whether they were going to name themselves Imperative (Imperial Generation) or Impericon (Imperial Conspiracy). By choosing 'Impericon' they avoided this brand collision.

Purchasable

Merchandise
Impericon sells merchandise from a  variety of bands, from groups such as Despised Icon and A Day to Remember others such as Ingested and Annotations of an Autopsy. They have merchandise from over 250 bands.

Streetwear
With nearly one hundred brands Impericon also has a streetwear collection with clothes from Puma, Vans, Yackfou, and Fullbleed. Impericon also sells shoes and accessories.

Events
Impericon also sells tickets to Hardcore concerts.

Accessories
Impericon sells accessories as well, like bags, wallets, socks, headphones, and snap-back hats.

External links

 Official website

Clothing brands of Germany